Soul Tourists is an experimental novel written by British-Nigerian author, Bernardine Evaristo. Published in 2005 by Penguin, Soul Tourists draws on elements of prose, poetry, scripts and other non-fiction devices. Featuring historical figures of the past, it tells the story of a mismatched black British couple travelling from Europe to the Middle East.

Reception

Reviews 
It was named Book of the Year by The Independent and The Independent on Sunday and described as 'a rollercoaster road movie in print where the language twists and turns more than a path through the Pyrenees. Evaristo crosses the border between prose, poetry and film script and exposes the hidden face of black European history in the process.’

Honours and awards 
 Independent Book of the Year
 Independent on Sunday Book of the Year

Bibliography 
 Soul Tourists (Hamish Hamilton), 2005)

References 

2005 British novels
Novels by Bernardine Evaristo
Hamish Hamilton books